Bhomita Talukdar (Assamese: ভমিতা তালুকদাৰ), alias Deepali, was the organisational secretary of the women's wing of ULFA. She is also the wife of Arun Mahanta, a hardcore ULFA militant of Barpeta. She was arrested on 7 August 2003, by the troops of Red Horns Division from the village Jangrinpara located in general area Fatimabad of Barpeta. She operated as a 'terrorist' and 'subversive' throughout southern Assam according to the Indian authorities.

See also
List of top leaders of ULFA
Sanjukta Mukti Fouj
Enigma Group

References

ULFA members
Living people
Prisoners and detainees from Assam
Year of birth missing (living people)